Vymol is a rural locality (a village) in Kichmengskoye Rural Settlement, Kichmengsko-Gorodetsky District, Vologda Oblast, Russia. The population was 22 as of 2002.

Geography 
Vymol is located 21 km northeast of Kichmengsky Gorodok (the district's administrative centre) by road. Lychenitsa is the nearest rural locality.

References 

Rural localities in Kichmengsko-Gorodetsky District